The 2002 Formula Nippon Championship was  contested over 10 rounds. 11 different teams, 22 different drivers. All teams had to use Reynard chassis and Mugen Honda (Mugen MF308) engines.

Teams and drivers

Calendar
All races were held in Japan.

Championship standings

Drivers' Championship
Scoring system

Teams' Championship

External links
2002 Japanese Championship Formula Nippon

Formula Nippon
Super Formula
Nippon